Greenville is a city and the county seat of Butler County, Alabama, United States. At the 2020 census, the population was 7,374. Greenville is known as the Camellia City, wherein originated the movement to change the official Alabama state flower from the goldenrod to the camellia with legislative sponsors LaMont Glass and H.B. Taylor.

History
Greenville was first settled in 1819. Its original name was Buttsville, but after becoming the county seat in 1822, its name was changed to Greenville, in remembrance of the former locale in South Carolina of many of the original settlers. The first county seat was at Fort Dale, a fortification that was named for Sam Dale, who fought to defend the area during the Creek War. The site of Fort Dale lies on the north of the city near the Fort Dale Cemetery, along what is now Alabama Highway 185.

The namesake of the county, Captain William Butler, was killed during the Creek War. He is buried in the Pioneer Cemetery, which is across from the oldest church in Butler County, the First United Methodist Church of Greenville.

During World War II, a satellite camp for German prisoners was based in Greenville.

Geography
Interstate 65 and U.S. Route 31 pass through the city.

Climate
The city averages  of precipitation per month.

Demographics

2020 census

As of the 2020 United States Census, there were 7,374 people, 2,356 households, and 1,496 families residing in the city.

2010 census
As of the census of 2010, there were 8,135  people, 3,332 households, and 2,126 families residing in the city. The racial makeup of the city was 55.5% Black or African American, 41.7% White, 0.0% Native American, 1.8% Asian, 0.5% from other races, and 0.5% from two or more races.  1.3% of the population were Hispanic or Latino of any race.

In the city, 27.3% of the population was under the age of 18, 8.6% were 18 to 24, 25.0% were 25 to 44, 24.4% were 45 to 64, and 14.8% were 65 years of age or older.  The median age was 35.3. For every 100 females, there were 82.2 males.  For every 100 females age 18 and over, there were 78.7 males.

There were 3,332 households. Of those, 31.6% had children under the age of 18 living with them, 35.0% were married couples living together, 25.3% had a female householder with no husband present, and 36.2% were non-families. 33.3% of all households were made up of individuals, and 13.1% had someone living alone who was 65 years of age or older.  The average household size was 2.40 and the average family size was 3.06.

The median income for a household in the city was $26,664, and the median income for a family was $31,107.  Males had a median income of $33,716 versus $24,928 for females.  The per capita income for the city was $15,649.  About 20.3% of families and 24.9% of the population were below the poverty line, including 30.1% of those under age 18 and 20.9% of those age 65 or over.

Economy
Prior to the Civil War, cotton farming was the main occupation in Butler County. During the 1850s, the Mobile and Ohio Railroad constructed a line through Greenville, enabling it to became the center of commerce between Montgomery and south Alabama. During the late nineteenth century, the construction of the Louisville and Nashville Railroad through Greenville contributed further to Greenville's prosperity. In 1900, Gulf Red Cedar Company and Factory in Greenville was a bucket manufacturer in Greenville.

As of 2009, Greenville had a diverse industrial manufacturing base of companies in the textile, wood products, automobile, and other industries. Major employers included Hwashin American Corporation, Hysco America Corporation, CorStone Industry, and Connector Manufacturing.

Arts and culture
The Ritz Theatre in Greenville hosts community events, plays, and an annuall musical revue called "Puttin' on the Ritz".

Each September, the city hosts the Butler County Fair, which includes the "Old Time Farm Day" featuring tractor races, blacksmithing and quilting demonstrations.

Parks and recreation
Cambrian Ridge is a golf course in Greenville.  Sherling Lake Park and Campground has 41 campsites and surrounds two lakes east of the golf course.

Government
The local government of Greenville is run by the Mayor and City Council. The city council consists of five members each elected from single member districts. The city is located in Alabama's 2nd Congressional District and is currently represented by U.S. Representative Barry Moore.

Education

Primary and secondary education
Public education is provided by the Butler County Board of Education.
High School: Greenville High School
Middle School: Greenville Middle School
Elementary School: W.O. Parmer Elementary and Greenville Elementary School

Private schools in Greenville include Fort Dale Academy and Camellia City Christian School.

Post-secondary education
Lurleen B. Wallace Community College, member of the Alabama Community College System awards two-year associate degrees and professional certificates.

Media

Radio stations
WGYV 1380 AM (Talk)
WKXN 95.7 FM (Urban Contemporary)
WQZX 94.3 FM

Newspaper
Weekly newspapers include The Greenville Standard, and Greenville Advocate.

Media filmed in Greenville
Residents were featured in the premiere episode of My Kind of Town (2005).

The movie Honeydripper (2007), was filmed in locations around Greenville in 2006.

Notable people
Janice Rogers Brown, Judge of the United States Court of Appeals for the District of Columbia Circuit
Beth Chapman, Secretary of State of Alabama from 2007 to 2013
Leon Crenshaw, former defensive tackle for the Green Bay Packers
Marlon Davidson, defensive tackle for the Atlanta Falcons
Walter Flowers, member of the United States House of Representatives from 1969 to 1979
Phil Hancock, professional golfer
Lillian Hatcher, union organizer 
Johnny Lewis, former outfielder for the St. Louis Cardinals and New York Mets
Tommy Lewis, former American football fullback and coach
George McMillan, 23rd Lieutenant Governor of Alabama
Mark Matthews, World War II veteran and Buffalo Soldier
Rufus Payne, blues musician
Lewis B. Porterfield, Rear admiral in the United States Navy
Bill Powell, first African American to design, construct and own a professional golf course in the United States
Marty Raybon, country music singer of the group Shenandoah
Za’Darius Smith, linebacker for the Minnesota Vikings 
Thomas H. Watts, eighteenth governor of Alabama
Hank Williams, country music singer lived in Greenville briefly during childhood
Ed Bell (musician), country blues singer and guitarist

Gallery

See also 

 National Register of Historic Places listings in Butler County, Alabama

References

External links

 
Cities in Alabama
Cities in Butler County, Alabama
County seats in Alabama
Populated places established in 1819
1819 establishments in Alabama